Smith & Nephew plc, also known as Smith+Nephew, is a British multinational medical equipment manufacturing company headquartered in Watford, England. It is an international producer of advanced wound management products, arthroscopy products, trauma and clinical therapy products, and orthopaedic reconstruction products. Its products are sold in over 100 countries. It is listed on the London Stock Exchange and is a constituent of the FTSE 100 Index.

History
The company was founded in 1856 by Thomas James Smith of Kingston upon Hull who went into business as a dispensing chemist. A few months before his death in 1896, Smith was joined by his nephew, Horatio Nelson Smith, and the business became known as T. J. Smith and Nephew.

In 1928 the company acquired the licence to market and produce the Elastoplast range of bandages. By 1977 the company acquired the pump manufacturer Watson-Marlow Pumps, which they sold to Spirax-Sarco Engineering in 1990. In 1986 it went on to acquire Richards Medical Company, a US specialist in orthopaedic products for £201 million.

In 2002 the company acquired Oratec Interventions, a surgical devices business, for $310 million. It went on to buy Midland Medical Technologies, a hip resurfacing business, for £67 million in 2004.

The company acquired Plus Orthopedics, a Swiss orthopedics business, for US$889 million in April 2007 and BlueSky, a US wound care business, for $110 million in May 2007.

In September 2007 Biomet Inc., DePuy Orthopaedics Inc. (part of Johnson & Johnson), Smith & Nephew PLC and Zimmer Holdings Inc. entered into settlement agreements, under which they agree to pay $300 million in total, adopt industry overhauls and undertake corporate monitoring to avoid criminal charges of conspiracy.

The company acquired Healthpoint Biotherapeutics, a specialist in the bioactives area of advanced wound management, for $782 million in December 2012.

In February 2014, Smith & Nephew announced the purchase of ArthroCare for US$1.7 billion in cash. This was seen as a move to broaden the company's sports medicine range for minimally invasive surgery moves the company into the Ear, Nose & Throat market.

In October 2015 Smith & Nephew announced the acquisition of Blue Belt Technologies (led by Eric Timko) for US$275 million, securing a leading position in the fast-growing area of orthopaedic robotics-assisted surgery.

In March 2019 Smith & Nephew announced the acquisition of orthopedic joint reconstruction business unit of Brainlab to further its foray into robotic surgery.

In June 2019 Smith & Nephew acquired Atracsys Sàrl, the Switzerland-based provider of optical tracking technology used in computer-assisted surgery.

In October 2019, Smith & Nephew announced Namal Nawana would stand down "because his requests for higher pay, in line with the packages awarded by US medical device-makers, could not be met under UK corporate governance standards". He is replaced by Roland Diggelmann.

In January 2021, the company acquired Integra LifeSciences’ extremity orthopaedics business for $240 million.

In January 2022, Smith & Nephew acquired the Florida-based partial knee implant company, Engage Surgical for $135 million.

In February 2022, Smith & Nephew announced that Roland Diggelmann would step down as CEO. He was replaced by Dr Deepak Nath.

Operations

Smith & Nephew operates in three market segments through separate global business units under the Smith & Nephew brand name:
Advanced wound management: advanced treatments for difficult wounds.
Endoscopy: products for minimally invasive surgery, based in Andover, Massachusetts, USA.
Orthopaedics: hip and knee implants and trauma products, based in Memphis, Tennessee, USA.

Controversies

In February 2012 Smith & Nephew plc agreed to pay US$22.2 million to settle multiple US Foreign Corrupt Practices Act (FCPA) offenses committed by its US and German subsidiaries.
Under the new agreements Smith & Nephew PLC paid $5.4 million in restitution and interest to settle the SEC's civil charges. Its US subsidiary Smith & Nephew Inc. paid a $16.8 million criminal fine.
The company admitted to having bribed government-employed doctors in Greece to use its medical equipment over the past decade. The company entered into a deferred prosecution agreement with the US Department of Justice (DOJ) and agreed to retain a compliance monitor for 18 months.

Awards
Awards include:
Manufacturer of the Year in 2007
Smith & Nephew Advanced Wound Management won Logistics and Supply Chain Manufacturer Award 2006
ASM International 2005 Engineering Materials Achievement Award for Smith & Nephew's trademarked oxinium technology
Smith & Nephew's Back Pain Study Receives Outstanding Paper Award at North American Spine Society 2003 Annual Meeting

References

Books
 Foreman-Peck, J. (1995), Smith & Nephew in the Health Care Industry, Edward Elgar.

External links

Official corporate website

Companies based in Watford
Medical technology companies of the United Kingdom
Manufacturing companies of the United Kingdom
British companies established in 1856
Manufacturing companies established in 1856
Companies listed on the London Stock Exchange
Companies listed on the New York Stock Exchange